Romania competed at the 2018 European Athletics Championships in Berlin, Germany, from 6–12 August 2018. A delegation of 36 athletes were sent to represent the country.

Results 

 Men 
 Track and road

Field events

Women
 Track and road

Field events

References

Nations at the 2018 European Athletics Championships
Romania at the European Athletics Championships
2018 in Romanian sport